The Centenary of Albany in 1927 commemorated the founding of Albany, Western Australia with a number of events.

It preceded the centenary of Western Australia by two years.  The Albany community and authorities were in direct conflict with the Western Australian government about the celebration and its proximity to the state centenary of 1929, both before the centenary and after.
 
The Western Mail celebrated with a special issue. Other regional newspapers also acknowledged Albany's founding and difference from state centenary, not all necessarily complimentarily. Comments well after both centenaries were being made due to the Perth-based 1929 centenary and its proponents as derogatory of the Albany event.

Events
 On 21 January 1927 normal business came to a standstill for the festivities. 
A message of congratulations arrived from King George V, who had twice unexpectedly visited the town... 
(it was followed by) a week of sports, dinners, picnics and a regatta

The main events to celebrate were conducted over the week of 21 to 28 January 1927, with the local newspaper, the Albany Advertiser, providing substantial editorial promotion of the event.

The Governor of Western Australia started the week with an unveiling of a memorial stone at the Albany Town Hall.
 
The celebrations included an "Exhibition of Secondary Industries".

Book
The booklet Centenary of Western Australia Albany 1827–1927 was produced by the Albany Centenary Committee and published by the Albany Advertiser. It provided background to the founding of Albany, including material previously published in the 1910–1913 publication "Alluring Albany".

The booklet subtitle provides the context of the celebration: commemoration of the raising of the British flag by Edmund Lockyer on 21 January 1827 to establish Western Australia's first settlement.

Notes

 
1927 in Albany, Western Australia
Books about or based in Albany, Western Australia
Albany